Carinodrillia apitoa is a species of sea snail, a marine gastropod mollusk in the family Pseudomelatomidae.

Description
The length of the shell attains 10 mm.

Distribution
This marine species occurs off Puerto Rico

References

 Corea, Lois Fleming. "New marine mollusks (with three plates)." (1934).
 Corea, Lois Fleming. Reports on the Collections Obtained by the First Johnson-Smithsonian Deep-Sea Expedition to the Puerto Rican Deep. New Marine Mollusks, Etc. 1934.

External links
 
 

apitoa
Gastropods described in 1934